Veselovka is a rural locality (a village) in Deniskinsky Selsoviet, Fyodorovsky District, Bashkortostan, Russia. The population was 233 as of 2010. There are 6 streets.

Geography 
Veselovka is located 27 km south of Fyodorovka (the district's administrative centre) by road. Deniskino is the nearest rural locality.

References 

Rural localities in Fyodorovsky District